Sanctions against Fiji were a series of economic sanctions against Fiji in response to the 2006 Fijian coup d'état. The sanctions began in 2006 and ended after elections were held in 2014.

Fiji was suspended from the Commonwealth of Nations in 2009, but rejoined in 2014. Fiji was also suspended from the Pacific Islands Forum in 2009, but rejoined in 2014.

Countries that sanctioned Fiji

Opposition to sanctions
The Government of Fiji actively opposed sanctions, as did several other countries, including China, India and Russia. These countries expanded their ties with Fiji after the coup.

Public opinion

Australia
A 2010 Lowy Institute poll showed that 56% of Australians supported retaining the limited travel restrictions against Fiji, 24% opposed all sanctions and wanted normalisation, 16% supported more sanctions and 4% were unsure. In 2012, another Lowy Institute poll showed that 79% of Australians supported restarting dialogue with Fiji (28% "strongly in favour" and 51% were "somewhat in favour"), 17% opposed restarting dialogue (11% "somewhat against" and 6% "strongly against") and 4% were unsure.

Fiji
A Lowy Institute poll conducted in Fiji under the direction of Jenny Hayward-Jones showed that 66% of people in Fiji approved of Prime Minister Commodore Frank Bainimarama. Per ethnic group, he was approved of by 75% of Indo-Fijians and 60% of iTaukei (Indigenous Fijians). This meant that Bainimarama was three times more popular among Fijians than Julia Gillard was among Australians. 79% of Fijians also disapproved of the suspension of Fiji from the Pacific Islands Forum and the Commonwealth of Nations. The survey was disputed by some, however, including national secretary of the Fiji Trade Union Congress, Felix Anthony.

References

Notes

Fiji
Foreign relations of Fiji
2006 Fijian coup d'état